Estonia participated in the Eurovision Song Contest 2006 with the song "Through My Window" written by Pearu Paulus, Ilmar Laisaar, Alar Kotkas and Jana Hallas. The song was performed by Sandra Oxenryd. The Estonian broadcaster Eesti Televisioon (ETV) organised the national final Eurolaul 2006 in order to select the Estonian entry for the 2006 contest in Athens, Greece. Ten songs competed in the national final and "Through My Window" performed by Sandra Oxenryd was selected as the winner by an international jury panel.

Estonia competed in the semi-final of the Eurovision Song Contest which took place on 18 May 2006. Performing during the show in position 21, "Through My Window" was not announced among the top 10 entries of the semi-final and therefore did not qualify to compete in the final. It was later revealed that Estonia placed eighteenth out of the 23 participating countries in the semi-final with 28 points.

Background 

In 2005, "Let's Get Loud" performed by Suntribe failed to qualify Estonia to the final where the song placed twentieth in the semi-final.

The Estonian national broadcaster, Eesti Televisioon (ETV), broadcasts the event within Estonia and organises the selection process for the nation's entry. Since their debut, the Estonian broadcaster has organised national finals that feature a competition among multiple artists and songs in order to select Estonia's entry for the Eurovision Song Contest. The Eurolaul competition has been organised since 1996 in order to select Estonia's entry and on 16 October 2005, ETV announced the organisation of Eurolaul 2006 in order to select the nation's 2006 entry.

Before Eurovision

Eurolaul 2006 
Eurolaul 2006 was the thirteenth edition of the Estonian national selection Eurolaul, which selected Estonia's entry for the Eurovision Song Contest 2006. The competition consisted of a ten-song final on 4 February 2006 at the ETV studios in Tallinn, hosted by Marko Reikop and Gerli Padar and broadcast on ETV. The national final was watched by 268,000 viewers in Estonia.

Competing entries 
On 16 October 2005, ETV opened the submission period for artists and composers to submit their entries up until 5 December 2005. 76 submissions were received by the deadline. A 10-member jury panel selected 6 finalists from the submissions, while an additional 4 finalists were selected by ETV via composers directly invited for the competition: Alar Kotkas, Ivar Must, Mikk Targo and Priit Pajusaar. The selected songs were announced on 13 January 2006 and among the competing artists was previous Eurovision Song Contest entrant Ines, who represented Estonia in 2000. Glow, Noorkuu and Sofia Rubina have all competed in previous editions of Eurolaul. The selection jury consisted of Jaak Joala (musician), Priit Hõbemägi (culture critic), Jaan Elgula (musician), Olavi Pihlamägi (journalist), Maarja-Liis Ilus (singer), Maido Maadik (Eesti Raadio sound engineer), Jaan Karp (musician), Heidy Purga (television presenter), Olav Osolin (music critic) and Jaagup Kreem (musician).

Final 
The final took place on 4 February 2006. Ten songs competed during the show and "Through My Window" performed by Sandra Oxenryd was selected as the winner by an international jury. A non-competitive public televote which registered 24,756 votes was also held and selected "Mr Right" performed by Meribel as the winner. The international jury panel consisted of Maja Tatić (Bosnia and Herzegovina), Marie N (Latvia), Jürgen Meier-Beer (Germany), Sietse Bakker (Netherlands), Jari Sillanpää (Finland), John Groves (United Kingdom), Sandra Studer (Switzerland), Urša Vlašic (Slovenia), Bo Halldórsson (Iceland) and Kobi Oshrat (Israel).

At Eurovision
According to Eurovision rules, all nations with the exceptions of the host country, the "Big Four" (France, Germany, Spain and the United Kingdom) and the ten highest placed finishers in the 2005 contest are required to qualify from the semi-final on 18 May 2006 in order to compete for the final on 20 May 2006; the top ten countries from the semi-final progress to the final. On 21 March 2006, a special allocation draw was held which determined the running order for the semi-final and Estonia was set to perform in position 21, following the entry from Sweden and before the entry from Bosnia and Herzegovina.

The semi-final and the final were broadcast in Estonia on ETV with commentary by Marko Reikop. The Estonian spokesperson, who announced the Estonian votes during the final, was Evelin Samuel who had previously represented Estonia in the Eurovision Song Contest in 1999 together with Camille.

Semi-final 

Sandra Oxenryd took part in technical rehearsals on 12 and 14 May, followed by dress rehearsals on 17 and 18 May. The Estonian performance featured Sandra Oxenryd performing on stage in a blue dress and white thigh boots with the stage displaying pink, yellow, purple and red colours. Sandra Oxenryd was joined by five backing vocalists, three of them which later joined Oxenryd from the raised parts of the stage that they initially stood on: Carita Nyström, Emma Andersson, Jacob Gyldenskog, Dagmar Oja and Jelena Juzvik.

At the end of the show, Estonia was not announced among the top 10 entries in the semi-final and therefore failed to qualify to compete in the final. It was later revealed that Estonia placed 18th in the semi-final, receiving a total of 28 points.

Voting 
Below is a breakdown of points awarded to Estonia and awarded by Estonia in the semi-final and grand final of the contest. The nation awarded its 12 points to Finland in the semi-final and the final of the contest.

Points awarded to Estonia

Points awarded by Estonia

References

2006
Countries in the Eurovision Song Contest 2006
Eurovision